Erwin Ortner (born 15 December 1947, in Vienna) is an Austrian conductor, especially of vocal music. He is the founder and artistic director of the Arnold Schoenberg Chor.

References

External links 

 
 
 Erwin Ortner Arnold Schoenberg Chor
 Erwin Ortner (Choral Conductor) bach-cantatas.com
 Hohe Ehre für Wiens neue Musik: Auszeichnungen für Ortner und Knessl wien.gv.at 2010 

Male conductors (music)
1947 births
Living people
Musicians from Vienna
21st-century Austrian conductors (music)
21st-century male musicians